Esmark is a surname. Notable people with the surname include:

Birgitte Esmark (1841–1897), Norwegian malacologist
Jens Esmark (1763–1839), Danish-Norwegian mineralogist, study of glaciers
Lars Mathias Hille Esmark (1908–1998), Norwegian civil servant
Morten Thrane Esmark (1801-1882), Norwegian priest and mineralogist

See also
Esmark Glacier, glacier in South Georgia Island
Esmarkbreen, glacier in Svalbard
JBS USA, successor of former holding company Esmark

Norwegian-language surnames